The following is a list of flags and banners related with Algeria.

National flag

Government flags

Military flags

Flags of ethnic groups

Corporations

Political flags

Historical flags

Proposed flags

See also 
 Flag of Algeria
 Emblem of Algeria

References 

Flags of Algeria
Lists and galleries of flags
Flags